Western Australian soccer clubs from the top three State-Based Divisions competed in 2009 for the WA State Challenge Cup, known that year as the Soccer Pools State Cup.  This knockout competition was won by Floreat Athena, their fifth title.

First round
All matches were completed by 29 March.  A total of 32 teams took part in this stage of the competition. All 12 Clubs from the State League Premier Division and Football West State League Division 1, and 8 clubs from the Sunday League Premier Division (the top 8 out of 12 from the previous year's league table) entered into the competition at this stage.

Second round
A total of 16 teams took part in this stage of the competition. All matches were completed by 31 May.

Quarter finals
A total of 8 teams took part in this stage of the competition.  All matches in this round were completed on 4 July.

Semi finals
A total of 4 teams took part in this stage of the competition. All matches in this round were completed by 15 August.

Final
The 2009 State League Cup Final was held at the neutral venue of Dorrien Gardens on 4 October.

References

External links

Football West State Cup
2009 in Australian soccer